The Central Regional Hospital, Cape Coast is a regional hospital in Cape Coast in the Central region of Ghana. It is now a teaching hospital and is thus known as the Cape-Coast Teaching Hospital (CCTH)  It serves as a facility for medical students from the University of Cape Coast. It is also a center of learning for several nurses training colleges.

References

Hospitals in Ghana